The canton of Bletterans is an administrative division of the Jura department, eastern France. Its borders were modified at the French canton reorganisation which came into effect in March 2015. Its seat is in Bletterans.

It consists of the following communes:
 
Abergement-le-Petit
Arlay
Aumont
Barretaine
Bersaillin
Biefmorin
Bletterans
Bois-de-Gand
Brainans
Champrougier
Chapelle-Voland
La Charme
La Chassagne
Le Chateley
Chaumergy
La Chaux-en-Bresse
Chemenot
Chêne-Sec
Colonne
Commenailles
Cosges
Darbonnay
Desnes
Les Deux-Fays
Fontainebrux
Foulenay
Francheville
Grozon
Larnaud
Lombard
Mantry
Miéry
Monay
Montholier
Nance
Neuvilley
Oussières
Passenans
Plasne
Quintigny
Recanoz
Relans
Les Repôts
Ruffey-sur-Seille
Rye
Saint-Lamain
Saint-Lothain
Sellières
Sergenaux
Sergenon
Toulouse-le-Château
Tourmont
Vers-sous-Sellières
Villerserine
Villers-les-Bois
Villevieux
Le Villey
Vincent-Froideville

References

Cantons of Jura (department)